Harry F. Dahms is Professor of Sociology, co-director of the Center for the Study of Social Justice and co-chair of the Committee on Social Theory at the University of Tennessee.

Dahms' primary research and teaching areas are theoretical sociology (social, sociological, and critical theory), planetary sociology, globalization, political economy, social inequality, sociology of film (with emphasis on the science-fiction genre), artificial intelligence, and social justice. He is the editor of Current Perspectives in Social Theory, and director of the International Social Theory Consortium (ISTC).

Education and career
Dahms obtained his master's degree in sociology, economics, and statistics in 1986 from the University of Konstanz, Germany, where he worked for and was supervised by Ralf Dahrendorf, and his PhD in sociology in 1993 from the New School for Social Research in New York, for a thesis entitled "The Entrepreneur in Western Capitalism: Schumpeter's Theory of Economic Development". While at the New School, he was supervised by Arthur Vidich and advised by Andrew Arato and José Casanova. He taught at Florida State University in Tallahassee from 1993 to 2004, and was a visiting professor at the University of Göttingen, Germany (1999–2000) and the University of Innsbruck, Austria (2011 and 2012; he also taught individual compact seminars between 2010 and 2019).

Work
Dahms's research and teaching pertains to the tensions in the modern age between economic change, on the one hand, and politics, culture and society, on the other. Interpreting the contributions of Marx and Weber, in particular, as foundations for a dynamic theory of modern society, he starts out from the proposition that it is only from the perspectives of “globalization” (including the debates about restructuring, transnational corporations, and neo-imperialism) and planetary sociology that the contradictions and paradoxes of modern society can be disentangled, at the intersection between identity structure and social structure.

The spectrum of his theoretical reference points reach from the critical theory of the Frankfurt School at one end, to Joseph Schumpeter's social theory of capitalism, at the other. In modern society, a particular kind of social order fused with a specific type of social processes, into an inherently irreconcilable force-field that maintains stability by devising mechanisms designed to contain the destructive power of the contradictions, in the process continually deepening those contradictions.  The consequence is a widening gap between the categories social scientists employ to “meaningfully” interpret present conditions, and the categories that would have to be developed and deployed to maintain the possibility of meaning—socially, culturally, and politically.

Dahms is also associate editor of Basic Income Studies, Soundings.  An Interdisciplinary Journal, and was a founding member of the editorial board of The Newfound Press, and imprint of the University of Tennessee Libraries.

Selected works
 The Vitality of Critical Theory. Emerald, 2011.
 Nature, Knowledge, and Negation (ed.). Current Perspectives in Social Theory, 26, Emerald, 2009.
 No Social Science Without Critical Theory (ed.). Current Perspectives in Social Theory, 25, Emerald, 2008.
 Globalization Between the Cold War and Neo-Imperialism (Special Volume Editor). Current Perspectives in Social Theory, 24, Elsevier/JAI, 2006.
Transformations of Capitalism: Economy, Society and the State in Modern Times (Editor). London: Palgrave, and New York: NYU Press, 2000.

Notes

External links
 Harry F. Dahms — Research and Teaching Lab, University of Tennessee.
 Center for the Study of Social Justice, University of Tennessee.
 ResearchGate Profile

The New School alumni
American sociologists
Living people
Universal basic income writers
Year of birth missing (living people)